The Delaware Corporate and Commercial Litigation Blog serves as a free public resource for the latest developments in Delaware corporate and commercial law by providing summaries of key corporate and commercial court decisions from the Delaware Court of Chancery and Delaware Supreme Court.  In addition to links to the actual opinions of the court, it provides links to commentary by leading scholars from around the United States on Delaware corporate law and alternative business entities.

This law blog is listed on the Harvard Law School Corporate Governance blog on their blogroll. Its reports have been mentioned several times by The Wall Street Journal online as one of the top national daily law blog stories.  It was selected as a "top blog" by LexisNexis.

See also 
Delaware Journal of Corporate Law
Delaware Supreme Court
Delaware Court of Chancery
Delaware General Corporation Law.

References

External links
 

Delaware law
American legal websites